Chlorostrymon telea, the telea hairstreak, is a butterfly of the family Lycaenidae. It was described by William Chapman Hewitsonin 1868. It is found from southern Texas and Mexico to Colombia, Uruguay, Paraguay, eastern Bolivia, Argentina and Chile. The habitat consists of stream valleys of semideciduous dry forests.

The wingspan is 16–22 mm. The upperside of the males is iridescent purple blue, while females are dull grey blue. There is a white postmedian line on the underside, forming a W shape near the inner margin. Adults are on wing in June in southern Texas and from January to July in Central America. They feed on flower nectar.

The larvae feed on the flowers of Guazuma species and Central American soapberry.

References

Eumaeini
Butterflies of Central America
Butterflies of the Caribbean
Butterflies of North America
Lycaenidae of South America
Butterflies described in 1868
Taxa named by William Chapman Hewitson